Hala railway station (Sindhi: هالا ريلوي اسٽيشن) is located in Hala City, District Matiari, Sindh, Pakistan.

See also
 List of railway stations in Pakistan
 Pakistan Railways
 Hala City
 Taluka Hala

References

Railway stations in Matiari District